Joachim Napoléon Murat, 5th Prince Murat (28 February 1856 – 2 November 1932) was a member of the Bonaparte-Murat family.

Early life
Joachim Napoléon Murat was born on 28 February 1856 at Boissy-Saint-Léger, Val-de-Marne, France.  His parents were Joachim Joseph Murat, 4th Prince Murat and of Malcy Louise Caroline Berthier de Wagram. His paternal grandparents were Prince Napoleon Lucien Charles Murat, 2nd Prince of Pontecorvo and 3rd Prince Murat, the second son of Joachim Murat, King of Naples, who married Napoleon's sister, Caroline Bonaparte, and Caroline Georgina Fraser (Charleston, South Carolina, 13 April 1810 – Paris, 10 February 1879), daughter of Thomas Fraser.

His maternal grandparents were Napoléon-Alexandre Berthier, 2nd Prince of Wagram (1810–1887) and Zénaïde Françoise Clary (1812–1884), who was the niece of Désirée Clary and Julie Clary. His maternal great-grandfather was Louis-Alexandre Berthier (1753–1815), 1st prince de Wagram, 1st duc de Valangin, 1st sovereign Prince of Neuchâtel, who was a Marshal and Vice-Constable of France beginning in 1808, and Chief of Staff (Major général) under Napoleon.

Career
In 1919, Prince Murat gave his Paris house on the rue de Monceau to President Woodrow Wilson for his use while in Paris for the Paris Peace Conference.

Personal life

On 10 May 1884 he married Marie Cécile Ney d'Elchingen, a daughter of the Prince de la Moskowa and a great-granddaughter of Marshal Michel Ney. Together, they were the parents of eight children, including:

 Joachim, 6th Prince Murat (1885–1938), who married Louise Amélie Plantié. Their son, Joachim, 7th Prince Murat was shot in 1944 while fighting for the French Resistance.
 Princess Marguerite Murat (1886–1956), who married Baron Edgar Lejeune
 Prince Pierre Murat (1887–1888), who died in infancy.
 Prince Alexandre Murat (1889–1926) who married Yvonne Gillois  
 Prince Charles Michael Joachim Napoleon Murat (1892–1973), who married Margaret Stuyvesant Rutherfurd (1891–1976), the step-daughter of William Kissam Vanderbilt and the granddaughter of Lewis Morris Rutherfurd (1816–1892) and Oliver Harriman (1829–1904), in 1929. She was previously married to U.S. Representative Ogden Livingston Mills (1884–1937) and Sir Paul Henry Dukes (1889–1967).
 Prince Paul Murat (1893–1964), who married Solange de La Rochefoucald
 Prince Louis Murat (1896–1916), who was killed in action during World War I.
 Prince Jérôme Murat (1898–1992).

Prince Louis died unmarried and Prince Charles had no issue; all the others did.  Prince Murat died at the family estate, Château de Chambly in Oise on 2 November 1932.

Ancestry

References

of the First French Empire

|-

1856 births
1932 deaths
19th-century French people
20th-century French people
People from Val-de-Marne
House of Bonaparte
Murat
Princes Murat
French people of American descent